is a Japanese politician of the Democratic Party of Japan, a member of the House of Councillors in the Diet (national legislature). A native of Fukushima Prefecture, she did her undergraduate study at Hosei University and later earned master's degrees from California State University, Fresno and Fukushima University. After serving in the town assembly of Hobara, Fukushima for two terms and the city assembly of Date, Fukushima, she was elected to the House of Councillors for the first time in 2007.

References 
 

Members of the House of Councillors (Japan)
Female members of the House of Councillors (Japan)
California State University, Fresno alumni
Japanese municipal councilors
Politicians from Fukushima Prefecture
Living people
1965 births
Democratic Party of Japan politicians
Hosei University alumni
Fukushima University alumni